Shuraḥbīl ibn al-Simṭ ibn al-Aswad al-Kindī commonly referred to as Ibn al-Simṭ, was a Kindite commander in the Muslim army against the Sasanian Persians at the Battle of al-Qadisiyya in 636 and later a Homs-based member of the inner circle of Mu'awiya ibn Abi Sufyan during the latter's governorship of Syria (639–661) and caliphate (661–680).

Life
Shurahbil was the son of the Kindite chieftain Simt ibn al-Aswad. Following the death of the Islamic prophet Muhammad, Shurahbil and his father loyally served the nascent Medina-based Muslim state and fought with distinction during the Ridda wars against the Arabian tribes that had defected from Medina. As a result, their star rose in Medina at the expense of al-Ash'ath ibn Qays, a rival Kindite chief who fought against the Muslims in the Ridda and repented following his defeat and capture in Yemen. While in the mid to late 630s, Simt played a role in the Muslim conquest of Syria, Shurahbil fought in the Muslim conquest of Iraq. The overall Muslim commander of the Iraqi front, Sa'd ibn Abi Waqqas, appointed the young Shurahbil as commander of the Muslim army's left wing at the decisive Battle of al-Qadisiyya in 636. Following the victory over the Sasanians in Iraq, Shurahbil was appointed by Sa'd the governor of the Sasanian capital at Ctesiphon (al-Mada'in in Arabic). He settled in the newly-established Arab garrison town of Kufa, but emerging as the weaker Kindite against al-Ash'ath in the rivalry for the leadership of the tribe in the city, he moved to join his father in Homs.

After moving to Syria, he became a committed partisan of its governor Mu'awiya ibn Abi Sufyan during the latter's conflict with the Kufa-based Caliph Ali in the First Muslim Civil War. He served as one of Mu'awiya's envoys to Ali in June 657, a month before the Battle of Siffin between the two sides, which ended in a stalemate. During Mu'awiya's caliphate (661–680) he was a member of the caliph's inner circle. At some point during Mu'awiya's or Yazid I's reign, he was surpassed in influence with the Umayyads by his Syrian Kindite rival, Husayn ibn Numayr al-Sakuni. There is no further record of Shurahbil or his family until the revolt of Yazid ibn al-Muhallab in Iraq in 720 when an unnamed son of Shurahbil was taken prisoner and executed by the rebels. The family was mentioned again during the Third Muslim Civil War in 744, when a great-grandson of Shurahbil, Simt ibn Thabit ibn Yazid, joined his erstwhile rival Mu'awiya ibn Yazid, a grandson of Husayn ibn Numayr, in opposition to Caliph Yazid III. Simt ibn Thabit was later crucified for leading a revolt in Homs against Caliph Marwan II. The descendants of Shurahbil or rather, his father, temporarily took over Homs in the Fourth Muslim Civil War, during Abbasid rule, in the early 9th century.

References

Bibliography

7th-century Arabs
7th-century people from the Umayyad Caliphate
Generals of the Rashidun Caliphate
Kinda
People from Homs
People of the First Fitna
People of the Muslim conquest of Persia
Ridda Wars